Jung-jin is a Korean masculine given name. Its meaning depends on the hanja used to write each syllable of the name. There are 75 hanja with the reading "jung" and 43 hanja with the reading "jin" on the South Korean government's official list of hanja which may be used in given names. People with this name include:

Park Jung-jin (born 1976), South Korean baseball pitcher
Lee Jung-jin (born 1978), South Korean actor
Seo Jung-jin (born 1989), South Korean football midfielder (K-League Challenge)
Lee Jung-jin (footballer) (born 1993), South Korean football midfielder (K-League Challenge)

See also
List of Korean given names

References

Korean masculine given names